Solo is a British sitcom that aired on BBC1 from 1981 to 1982. Starring Felicity Kendal, Solo was written by Carla Lane, a writer well known for having previously written the sitcom Butterflies.

Kendal plays Gemma Palmer, a woman who changes her life after discovering her live-in boyfriend has had an affair.

Production
Following the success of the BBC sitcom The Good Life, each of its four main stars were given their own programme with them as the lead, and Solo was Kendal's. Similar to Carla Lane's sitcom Butterflies, Solo has serious themes and plots but still has humour. The programme was produced by Gareth Gwenlan. 
The theme music was the theme from Op. 107 no. 7 by Beethoven, a set of flute and piano variations on the Ukrainian folk song Minka.

Cast
Felicity Kendal – Gemma Palmer
Elspet Gray – Mrs. Elizabeth Palmer
Sarah Bullen – Julia
Stephen Moore – Danny Tyrrell (series 1)
Debbie Wheeler – Josie (series 1)
Stella Goodier – Bernadette (series 1)
Michael Howe – Sebastian Bale (series 2)
Belinda Mayne – Rosie (series 2)
David Rintoul – Rex Collins (series 2)
Peter Howitt – Raif

Plot

Series One
When thirty-year-old Gemma Palmer discovers that her live-in boyfriend Danny Tyrrell has been having an affair with her best friend Gloria, she chucks him out of her flat and quits her office job. The incident makes Gemma realise that she was being treated as a doormat by her friends and colleagues, and gets rid of all her old friends. She then tries to change herself into a stronger person, but she is unable to change her core beliefs and remains very emotional. Despite splitting from Danny, they remain friends, and he wants them to get back together. Danny and Gemma briefly live together towards the end of the series, but after one week she asks him to leave, saying she wants to be single again.

Gemma's traditional-thinking mother is the widowed 55-year-old Mrs. Palmer, whose husband Arnold died after 30 years of marriage and three children. She would like Gemma to settle down, marry and have children, like she did, but Gemma wants more out of life. During the series, she starts a relationship with a 35-year-old man, the unseen Howard.

The flat above Gemma's is occupied by two flat-sharing twenty-somethings; blonde Josie, a petrol pump attendant, and Bernadette, a nurse. Josie is constantly worrying and talking about her current boyfriend, and later becomes pregnant by the unseen Geoffrey. Bernadette meanwhile has little luck with men. At the end of the series, Josie and Geoffrey get a bedsit together.

Series Two
The second series begins six months after Gemma told Danny to leave and she is now 31 years old. Happily living alone, she has a brief relationship with 19-year-old Raif before meeting Sebastian Bale, a philanderer who lives in the flat above her. The night they meet, they sleep together but after that, they become good friends and breakfasting together most mornings. Towards the end of the series, Sebastian begins to grow ever closer to Rosie, whom he met a party. Rosie soon separates from her partner, artist Rex Collins, and he and Gemma then start seeing each other. The series ends with Sebastian and Rosie engaged, with he having to reluctantly end the daily breakfast he enjoyed with Gemma. Gemma meanwhile appears to separate from Rex after arguing about her future domestic role if they got married.

Gemma's mother Mrs. Palmer, whose first name is revealed as Elizabeth, continues her relationship with the younger Howard. She continues to wish that Gemma would settle down, and after one argument she and Gemma meet less often to give Gemma her own space. As the series ends, Mrs. Palmer goes through the menopause but Howard sticks by her, despite her worries.

Episodes
Solo aired for two series from 11 January 1981 to 17 October 1982, and each of the thirteen episodes is thirty minutes long. When originally aired, the episodes were broadcast on Sunday evenings on BBC1. On 10 March 1989, seven years after the last episode aired, a Comic Relief special short episode, "The Last Waltz", aired on BBC1. Written especially by Carla Lane, it features characters from four of Lane's sitcoms; Solo, Butterflies, Bread and The Liver Birds.

Series One (1981)

Series Two (1982)

Comic Relief Special (1989)

DVD releases
The two series of Solo were released in a boxset in Region 2 (UK) on 17 March 2003.

References
General

Specific

External links 
 
 

1981 British television series debuts
1982 British television series endings
1980s British sitcoms
BBC television sitcoms
Television shows set in London